Bernard Shrimsley (13 January 1931 – 9 June 2016) was a British journalist and newspaper editor.

Early life and career

The son of John, a tailor’s pattern cutter, and his wife Alice, a homemaker, Shrimsley (previously Shremski) was born in London to a Jewish family who had migrated to the UK. Educated at Kilburn Grammar School, along with his brother, Anthony, Shrimsley was evacuated to Northampton from London during the war, but had to go the police for a release as their guardians mistreated them. After leaving school, he became a messenger at the Press Association in London.

After a year, he was taken on as a trainee at the Southport Guardian in 1948 where he remained, apart from his National Service in the Royal Air Force, until 1953. After spells at the Manchester offices of both the Daily Mirror and the Daily Express, plus a brief period in the Daily Mirrors London headquarters, Shrimsley was appointed as the editor of the Liverpool Daily Post in 1968.

Appointed as deputy editor of The Sun newspaper in 1969 shortly before its relaunch as a tabloid, Shrimsley was recommended to new owner Rupert Murdoch by Larry Lamb, his immediate superior. The circulation of the paper doubled to 1.6 million in the first year. Shrimsley served in the same role until 1972. He became editor of The Sun that year. At The Sun he once asked for the photograph of a Page 3 model to be altered: "Nipples too fantastic; make nipples less fantastic". Years later in an interview, he said they "looked like a couple of plastic coat pegs".

Remaining in that post until 1975, he took over the equivalent job at The Suns Sunday sister title, the News of the World. During his time as editor of the News of the World, which was then still a broadsheet, its circulation declined by a million. Murdoch was urged by Shrimsley to re-launch the paper as a tabloid, a change which was not taken up by Murdoch at the time. Shrimsley ceased to be editor of the News of the World "by mutual agreement", according to an announcement from News Group Newspapers, in late April 1980.

Bernard's younger brother, Anthony (1934–1984), was  political editor of three national newspapers (the Sunday Mirror, The Sun and the Daily Mail) and editor of Sir James Goldsmith's short-lived news magazine Now!.

Later life and career
Shrimsley was taken on by Associated Newspapers in 1980 to launch The Mail on Sunday, but Lord Rothermere, the chairman of Associated, did not discuss the appointment with David English, the editor of sister title, the Daily Mail, who made Shrimsley's job difficult. English refused permission for any Mail writer to work for the new stablemate. Following the launch in May 1982, The Mail on Sundays initially projected circulation of 1.25 million, was not reached after ten issues, and Shrimsley was replaced. English succeeded him in July.

His former Murdoch colleague, (now Sir) Larry Lamb, was now editor of the Daily Express. He choose Shrimsley as the title's assistant editor, a post he held between 1983–86. After Lamb left the Express, Shrimsley served as the associate editor during 1986–96. He advised Sir James Goldsmith's Referendum Party during the 1997 general election, and wrote editorials for the Press Gazette from 1999 until 2002. He continued to write articles for the publication subsequently. Meanwhile, he had become the chair of the Press Council and served on the D-notice committee advising the media on stories concerning national security.

Shrimsley wrote three novels after his retirement: The Candidates, Lion Rampant and The Silly Season (2003). The Silly Season, wrote Roy Greenslade in The Guardian, is a "fine piece of satire" about tabloid journalism which contains "considerable wit and verve". It contains "a thinly veiled portrait" of former Sun editor, Kelvin MacKenzie, combined with elements of the "self-publicising egoism" of Piers Morgan, then editor of the Mirror.

Shrimsley married Norma Porter in 1952 (died 2009); their daughter Amanda was a feature writer for the News of the World. He died on 9 June 2016, aged 85.

References

1931 births
2016 deaths
British male journalists
British newspaper editors
News of the World people
People educated at Kilburn Grammar School
The Sun (United Kingdom) editors
20th-century British journalists